Talkh Ab (also Romanized as Talkh Āb; also known as Forū Talkhāb and Talkhābād) is a village in Kamaraj Rural District, Kamaraj and Konartakhteh District, Kazerun County, Fars Province, Iran. At the 2006 census, its population was 132, in 24 families.

References 

Populated places in Kazerun County